Kannara may refer to:

 Krishna I (r. c. 756-774 CE), Rashtrakuta king of present-day India 
 Krishna II (r. c. 878–914 CE), Rashtrakuta king of present-day India
 Krishna of Devagiri (r. c. 1246-1260 CE), Seuna (Yadava) king of present-day India
 Kannara, Thrissur, a village in Kerala, India